Várpalota is a district in eastern part of Veszprém County. Várpalota is also the name of the town where the district seat is found. The district is located in the Central Transdanubia Statistical Region.

Geography 
Várpalota District borders with Mór District (Fejér County) to the northeast, Székesfehérvár District (Fejér County) to the east, Balatonalmádi District to the south, Veszprém District to the west, Zirc District to the northwest. The number of the inhabited places in Várpalota District is 8.

Municipalities 
The district has 2 towns, 1 large village and 5 villages.
(ordered by population, as of 1 January 2013)

The bolded municipalities are cities, italics municipality is large village.

See also
List of cities and towns in Hungary

References

External links
 Postal codes of the Várpalota District

Districts in Veszprém County